Suyetsky District is an administrative and municipal district (raion), one of the fifty-nine in Altai Krai, Russia. It is located in the northwest of the krai. Its administrative center is the rural locality (a selo) of Verkh-Suyetka. As of the 2010 Census, the total population of the district was 5,120, with the population of Verkh-Suyetka accounting for 43.4% of that number.

History
The district was established on January 15, 1944 when Altai Krai was divided into districts. It was abolished in 1962 and re-established in 1989.

References

Notes

Sources

Districts of Altai Krai
States and territories established in 1944
States and territories disestablished in 1962
States and territories established in 1989
